Kisovec is a settlement in the Municipality of Zagorje ob Savi in central Slovenia. The settlement developed around the local coal mine, closed in 1952. Since 1978 a factory producing aerated autoclaved concrete has been in operation in the settlement and provided employment for local people.  The area is part of the traditional region of Upper Carniola. It is now included with the rest of the municipality in the Central Sava Statistical Region.

References

External links

Kisovec on Geopedia

Populated places in the Municipality of Zagorje ob Savi